Anand–Gandhinagar Capital MEMU is a MEMU train belonging to Western Railway zone that runs between  in Gujarat and  of Gujarat. It is currently being operated with 69191/69192 train numbers on daily basis.

Route and halts

The important halts of the train are:

Average speed and frequency

69191/Anand–Gandhinagar MEMU has an average speed of 30 km/h and completes 99 km in 3 hour and 15 minutes. 69192/Gandhinagar–Anand MEMU has average speed of 34 km/h and completes 99 km in 2 hour and 55 minutes. There are seven trains which run on a daily basis

Schedule

Traction 

MEMU: Rated power is 1600 HP and has 10 coaches with maximum speed is 130 kmph. Transmission is AC electric. Rakes are made at ICF coach.

Rake sharing

The rake is shared with 69131/69132 Ahmedabad–Gandhinagar Capital MEMU

See also 

 Gandhinagar Capital railway station
 Ahmedabad–Gandhinagar Capital MEMU

Notes

References

External links 

 69191/Anand - Gandhinagar MEMU
 69192/Gandhinagar - Anand MEMU

Anand district
Transport in Gandhinagar
Electric multiple units in Gujarat